Colored people's time (also abbreviated to CP time or CPT)  is an American expression referring to African Americans as frequently being late. It states that African Americans can have a relaxed or indifferent view of work ethic, which leads to them being labeled as lazy or unreliable. 

According to NPR's podcast Code Switch, the phrase has variations in many other languages and cultures, is often used as a light-hearted comment or joke regarding being late, and may have first been used in 1914 by The Chicago Defender newspaper.

There are differences between monochronic societies and polychronic societies (e.g. some of those found in Sub-Saharan Africa).

In popular culture
The expression has been referenced numerous times in various types of media, including the films The Best Man, Bamboozled, Undercover Brother, Let's Do It Again, House Party and several television series: The Mindy Project, Prison Break, The Boondocks, The Wire, Weeds, Where My Dogs At?, Reno 911!, 30 Rock, Everybody Hates Chris, A Different World, The PJs, Bridezillas, Mad TV, Cedric the Entertainer Presents, In Living Color, Empire, F is for Family, and reality series The Real Housewives of Atlanta. 

In the Maude episode Florida's Problem (season 1, episode 18), which aired on February 13, 1973, Henry Evans (who later becomes James Evans Sr. on Good Times) says to Florida, "I'm coming back at 9:00, and I mean 9:00 WPT."  He leaves and Maude asks Florida, what's "WPT"?  Florida responds "White People Time. If he didn't mean 9:00 sharp he would have said CPT. That's Colored People Time. Which means 'shuffle on in when you feel like it'". 

In The Wire season 3 episode 8 "Moral Midgetry", when Devonne asked Marlo Stanfield when he wants to meet, Marlo responded, "Five.  And five mean five.  I don't truck CP Time.  Five and change; I'm gone." The mention of "CPT" in the television series Prison Break was by the white supremacist character Theodore "T-Bag" Bagwell. 

In the Black Jeopardy sketch aired during the March 29, 2014 episode of Saturday Night Live, host Darnell Hayes (Kenan Thompson) says upon the sound of the final bell, "As usual, we started late." On an episode of The Neighborhood aired October 22, 2018, "CP Time" was mentioned and assumed by the main characters to mean "Cool People's Time".

R&B Singer Solange's album When I Get Home features the song "Binz", which contains the lyrics "I just wanna wake up on C.P. time"

Colored People's Time was used as the name of a 1960s public interest program produced by Detroit Public Television and of a 1980s play written by Leslie Lee, the latter of which consisted of 13 vignettes of African American history from the Civil War through the Montgomery bus riots. CP Time was also a 2007 book by J. L. King.

In his 1982 book Let the Trumpet Sound: The Life of Martin Luther King, Jr., author Stephen B. Oates notes that Martin Luther King Jr. and his staff operated by what they jocularly called "CPT"—Colored People's Time—"and kept appointments with cheerful disregard for punctuality".  King once apologized for being late for a banquet, saying he forgot what time he was on—EST, CST, or Colored People's Time, adding that "It always takes us longer to get where we're going."

In April 2016, in a staged joke skit done for charity, Mayor of New York City Bill de Blasio said he was on "C.P. time" for not previously endorsing Hillary Clinton for President. Leslie Odom Jr. then said he did not like the joke. After that Clinton  delivered the punch line that it was supposed to mean "cautious politician time". This was criticized as racist and tasteless. In response to this, President Barack Obama, during the 2016 White House Correspondents' Dinner on April 30, jokingly apologized for being late because of "running on C.P.T.", adding that this stands for "jokes white people should not make".

In February 2018, Roy Wood Jr. presented a segment on The Daily Show called "CP Time" to celebrate Black History Month by "honoring the unsung heroes of black history". It has since become a recurring segment on the show.

See also
 Tardiness#Ethnic stereotypes, describing several other similar expressions
 African time
 Chronemics

References

Stereotypes of African Americans
Time management